Cowper  is a stop on the Luas light-rail tram system in Dublin, Ireland.  It opened in 2004 as a stop on the Green Line from St Stephen's Green station to Sandyford. It serves parts of Ranelagh and Rathmines.

The Green Line runs on mostly segregated track, making use of a disused railway alignment.  The Cowper stop is located between the backs of residential properties.  The stop has the signs, displays, shelters, and ticket machines common to all Luas stops.  It has two entrances: one from Merton Road and one from Tudor Road.  Both entrances consist of simple tree-lined pathways and lead to the southern end of the platforms.  The Merton Road entrance is signposted with a solar-powered totem.

It takes its name from the nearby Cowper Road, which is named for William Cowper-Temple, 1st Baron Mount Temple (1811–1888), who formerly owned land in the area. He pronounced his name "cooper", but the station is pronounced "cow-per."

References

Luas Green Line stops in Dublin (city)